"Letter Home" is a song written by Wendy Waldman, and recorded by American country music group The Forester Sisters.  It was released in June 1988 as the first single from the album Sincerely.  The song reached number 9 on the Billboard Hot Country Singles & Tracks chart.

Charts

Weekly charts

Year-end charts

References

1988 singles
1988 songs
The Forester Sisters songs
Songs written by Wendy Waldman
Warner Records singles